The lieutenant governor of Arizona will be a constitutional office in the State of Arizona, whose holder will be the first in line to succeed the governor of Arizona when the governor dies, resigns or is removed from office, a role presently filled by the elected secretary of State.

In November 2022 the Arizona electorate approved an amendment (Proposition 131) to the state constitution which creates the position of lieutenant governor beginning January 2027. The position will be elected on a joint ticket with the governor. The lieutenant governor would succeed the governor if the governor dies, resigns or is removed (via impeachment conviction) from office. The Proposition — through a  law pre-passed by the Legislature — will also task the governor with assigning a job to her or his running mate, such as chief of staff, the director of the state Department of Administration, or "any position" to which the governor can appoint someone by law.

References 

Government of Arizona
Arizona
2022 in Arizona